Gong Global Family – Live in Brazil 2007 is a live album and DVD by the psychedelic rock band Gong in their Global Family format, recorded on 20 November 2007 at the SESI theatre in São Paulo, but not released until 2009 by Voiceprint, catalogue number VP520CD. No producer was credited, but mixing and mastering were carried out by guitarist Fabio Golfetti and video editing and DVD were by Flavio Tsutsumi.

Track listing
 "You Can't Kill Me" [DVD] – 6:39
 "Radio Gnome Invisible" [DVD] – 8:23
 "Fohat Digs Holes in Space" [DVD] – 11:15
 "Oily Way" [DVD] – 3:25
 "Outer Temple" [DVD] – 2:12
 "Inner Temple" [DVD] – 2:07
 "Master Builder" [DVD] – 8:07
 "Tropical Fish" [DVD] – 6:16
 "Selene" [DVD] – 7:05
 "Dynamite" [DVD] – 8:23

Personnel
Musicians
 Daevid Allen – guitar, vocals
 Fred Barley – drums
 Gabriel Costa – bass
 Fabio Golfetti – guitar
 Josh Pollock – guitar, megaphone
 Marcelo Ringel – saxophone

Production
 Paulo Bira – engineer
 Michael Clare – inside photo
 Fabio Golfetti – mastering, mixing
 Fernando Lopes – live sound technician
 Angelo Pastorello – cover photo, inside photo
 Flavio Tsutsumi – cameraman, video editor
 Julio Bruscalin, Mariana De Cicco, Ricardo Palomares, Tati Mello – cameraman

References

External links
 
 

2009 video albums
Live video albums
Gong (band) live albums
2009 live albums
Voiceprint Records albums